Chobienia may refer to:
Chobienia, Góra County, Poland
Chobienia, Lubin County, Poland